Mzwandile Ndzimandze (born 2 October 1985) is an Eswatini international footballer who plays for Pretoria University. He is commonly referred to as 'Dile'.

Career
The striker joined in summer 2010 from Mhlambanyatsi Rovers of the Swazi Premier League to Pretoria University F.C.

Personal life
His brother Mfanfikile 'Fash' Ndzimandze is also an international footballer for Eswatini.

References

External links

1985 births
Living people
Swazi footballers
Swazi expatriate footballers
Eswatini international footballers
University of Pretoria F.C. players
Association football forwards
Swazi expatriate sportspeople in South Africa
Expatriate soccer players in South Africa
Expatriate footballers in Spain